OpenVAERS is an American anti-vaccine website created in 2021 by Liz Willner. The website misrepresents data from the Vaccine Adverse Event Reporting System (VAERS) to promote misinformation about COVID-19 vaccines.

History 
Lizabeth Pearl "Liz" Willner has worked as a freelance web designer. Willner resides in Oakland, California.

In April 2019, Willner began posting anti-vaccine content after reporting that her child suffered an injury after receiving a vaccine. Willner initially focused her efforts on opposing Senate Bill 276 in California, a piece of legislation introduced to tighten vaccination exemption rules for children.

In September 2019, Willner started OpenVAERS as a project of the website The Arktivist. When the COVID-19 pandemic began in 2020, Willner began investing time in the OpenVAERS project, and opposed lockdown measures imposed in California. In January 2021, Willner launched OpenVAERS as a standalone website.

Influence 
In August 2021, the British anti-disinformation organization Logically reported that 30% of the website's referral traffic came from The Gateway Pundit, a far-right fake news website, and over 10% came from English conspiracy theorist Vernon Coleman. Logically also found that almost 3% of the referral traffic for the official VAERS database came from OpenVAERS. According to Logically, the website has attracted 1.23 million visitors since its launch.

COVID-19 vaccine misinformation 
OpenVAERS misrepresents data from the VAERS database to indicate that the COVID-19 vaccines are harmful, by publishing unverified data and statistics on the number of people who have allegedly died or suffered injuries after being vaccinated against COVID-19. Kolina Koltai, a Postdoctoral Fellow of the Center for an Informed Public (ICP) at the University of Washington, described OpenVAERS as "misinformation 101", adding: "It's decontextualization. I literally show examples like that in classes that I teach. You take a bit of information and you remove all the other context from it. That's common with almost any misinformation you can see."

References

External links 

 

Anti-vaccination media
Anti-vaccination in the United States
COVID-19 vaccine misinformation and hesitancy
Internet properties established in 2021